In computing the Berkeley Automounter (or amd) is a computer automounter daemon which first appeared in 4.4BSD in 1994. The original Berkeley automounter was created by Jan-Simon Pendry in 1989 and was donated to Berkeley.  After languishing for a few years, the maintenance was picked up by Erez Zadok, who has maintained it since 1993.

The am-utils package which comprises and is included with FreeBSD, NetBSD, and OpenBSD.  It is also included with a vast number of Linux distributions, including Red Hat Enterprise Linux, Fedora Core, ASPLinux, Trustix, Mandriva, and others.

The Berkeley automounter has a large number of contributors, including several who worked on the original automounter with Jan-Simon Pendry.

It is one of the oldest and more portable automounters available today, as well as the most flexible and the most widely used.

Caveats 

There are a few "side effects" that come with files that are mounted using automounter, these may differ depending on how the service was configured.

 Access time of automounted directories is initially set to the time automounter was used to mount them, however after the directories are accessed, this statistic changes.
 On some systems, directories are not visible until the first time they are used. This means commands such as ls will fail.
 If mounted directories are not used for a period of time, directories are unmounted.
 When automounter mounts directories, they are said to be owned by root until someone uses them, at that time the correct owner of the directory shows up.

References

External links 
 Am-utils Home Page (home of amd)
 RPMs from rpmfind.net

Unix network-related software